Carex hinnulea is a tussock-forming species of perennial sedge in the family Cyperaceae. It is native to Jamaica.

See also
List of Carex species

References

hinnulea
Plants described in 1900
Taxa named by Charles Baron Clarke
Flora of Jamaica